The 1988–89 Vancouver Canucks season saw the Canucks finish in fourth place in the Smythe Division with a record of 33 wins, 39 losses, and 8 ties for 74 points. They met the first-place Calgary Flames in the Division Semi-finals and extended the series to a decisive seventh game. However, the Flames took the game and the series on a Joel Otto goal in overtime en route to a Stanley Cup championship.

Off-season
In June 1988, Nelson Skalbania attempted to broker a deal with his friend, Edmonton Oilers owner Peter Pocklington to acquire Wayne Gretzky for the Canucks. Skalbania was also in talks with Gretzky's agent Mike Barnett. Pat Quinn secured a good chunk of the Canucks future by drafting Trevor Linden second overall in the Entry Draft, and would continue his wheeling and dealing that had begun the previous summer. The Canucks only had to part with a third-round pick in 1989 (Veli-Pekka Kautonen) to obtain the services of veterans Paul Reinhart and Steve Bozek from Calgary on September 6. The next day, defenseman Robert Nordmark and a second-round pick in 1989 (Craig Darby) arrived from St. Louis for Dave Richter. The Canucks would have their power-play point men for the coming season in order, and gave up hardly anything to get them. The free-agent signing of Harold Snepsts returned a familiar face to the Canucks blueline, and suddenly defence seemed to be a strength of the Canucks. Combined with solid netminding from Kirk McLean and Steve Weeks, only powerhouses Montreal and Calgary would surrender fewer goals than the Canucks this season. This would also be the grittiest team that Vancouver fans had seen in a while. With Garth Butcher, Rich Sutter, Stan Smyl, Jim Sandlak, Ronnie Stern, Darryl Stanley, and Snepsts in the line-up, Vancouver was suddenly a not-so-pleasant stop on a western road trip.

NHL Draft

Regular season
Things looked bright when the Canucks went 6-1-1 in the pre-season and on an early-season visit to Edmonton ended a three-year, 27-game winless streak against the Oilers with a 6–2 victory. Though they would only lose by more than three goals once all season, goal production was a problem.  Both Tony Tanti (47 points) and Stan Smyl (25) had big drop-offs in production and, by association, so did Greg D. Adams (33) and Barry Pederson (41). The scoring slack was picked up somewhat by Petri Skriko (66 points), Linden (59), and by Reinhart (57) and Nordmark (41). Even with that, however, by mid-season the Canucks were only producing results that were marginally better than the previous few seasons and only remained in the playoff race due to an unexpectedly poor season by Winnipeg. A club-record seven-game winning streak in February changed the team's outlook. Jim Sandlak was the hero in the seventh win, a tight-checking game against Toronto that was played in front of a packed house and a national television audience.  His rebound goal with 18 seconds to play in overtime off of a Snepsts point shot after an offensive-zone face-off win by Linden sent the home crowd into a frenzy.  People around the league were now taking notice.  Don Cherry hopped on the Canucks bandwagon and on Coach's Corner wore a button declaring "I vote Trevor Linden NHL Rookie-of-the-Year 1989".  Those buttons became a common site around town that spring.  In the game following the seventh win, the Canucks lost 3–2 in Montreal to end the streak, but Linden scored twice to tie and pass Ivan Hlinka's club record for rookie goal scoring.  He finished with 30—tied with Skriko for the team lead.  These new heroes would continue to delight the Coliseum faithful, as they racked up a 12-game home unbeaten streak (11-0-1).  The Canucks nailed down a playoff spot on March 23 and threatened to overtake Edmonton for third place in the Smythe before tapering off in the last couple of weeks.  The 74 points would earn them a playoff date against the NHL's number one team in the regular season, the Calgary Flames.

Despite finishing last in scoring, with just 251 goals scored, the Canucks had a solid defensive corps, finishing 3rd in fewest goals allowed (253).

Season standings

Schedule and results

Transactions

Trades

Player statistics

Forwards
Note: GP= Games played; G= Goals; AST= Assists; PTS = Points; PIM = Points

Defencemen
Note: GP= Games played; G= Goals; AST= Assists; PTS = Points; PIM = Points

Goaltending
Note: GP= Games played; W= Wins; L= Losses; T = Ties; SO = Shutouts; GAA = Goals Against

Playoffs

Smythe Division Semi-finals
This was going to be a short series.  Nobody was predicting more than five games.  Jim Taylor of The Province even predicted that it would be the first best-of-seven series to be settled in three. The Flames were given 3:1 odds to win the Stanley Cup, while the long shot Canucks' odds were set at 100:1. In the first game, however, the Canucks managed to stay within a goal of the powerful Flames until Robert Nordmark tied the game on a third-period power-play. In the dying minutes, Harold Snepsts made a game-saving stop when Kirk McLean was caught out of position.  At the 2:33 mark of the extra frame, ex-Flame Paul Reinhart exacted revenge on the team that was so quick to part with him by sending a wrist shot through traffic over Mike Vernon's left shoulder. To the surprise of many, the Canucks had won 4-3 and struck first blood in the series.  In the next two games, however, the Flames showed everybody how they managed 117 points during the regular season, dominating the Canucks in all facets of the game in scoring 5-2 and 4-0 victories.  It looked doubtful that the series would last longer than five games.  But the Vancouver Canucks weren't going to roll over.  They bothered and pestered the more talented Flames into taking stupid penalties, resulting in four power-play goals and a shocking 5–1 lead, which chased Vernon from the game.  Trevor Linden, who would earn a reputation as a clutch playoff performer, had four points on the night, including his first ever playoff goal.  The Flames scored two late goals to make it a 5–3 final, and the series was now even.  But four games in five nights had taken its toll, and the overworked Canucks were no match for the depth of the Flames in Game Five.  The Calgarians cruised to another 4–0 win, and looked to end the series two nights later.  Unfortunately for the Flames, the 16,553 fans that packed the Coliseum on the night of April 13 had no intention of seeing that happen.  The building was alive in a way that hadn't been seen in Vancouver since 1982.  Trailing 1–0 in the second period, Linden brought the crowd to its feet when he split the defense and scored a beautiful goal to tie the score.  The Flames regained the lead, but three goals in 2:18 late in the period, scored by Brian Bradley, Rich Sutter, and Garth Butcher (with his first goal all season), gave the Canucks a 4-2 cushion heading into the final frame.  The Flames did not want to go to a seventh game and demonstrated that in the third period.  They got to within a goal and were pressing hard for the equalizer.  The team defense of the Canucks was showing, though, as they were forcing most shots from the outside.  With less than four minutes to play, a deflection off of two sticks caused two Flame skaters to be caught flat-footed.  Speedy Brian Bradley, another ex-Flame, beat them both to the puck and found himself on a breakaway. He skated in on Vernon, faked to the forehand, deked to the backhand, and scored to give the Canucks a 5–3 lead, which turned the Coliseum into a madhouse.  The deal was sealed with an empty-netter at 19:56 and the series was, incredibly, headed back to "CowTown" for a seventh game.

The tone of nervousness that set across Southern Alberta was unmistakable.  A loss to the lowly Canucks would not be tolerated. Surely Terry Crisp would not keep his job should the Flames lose this game.  The Saddledome was eerily quiet as the game began, which was a stark contrast to the raucous Coliseum two nights earlier.  Joe Nieuwendyk and Robert Nordmark traded power-play goals in the first thirteen minutes.  With two minutes to play in the period, Al MacInnis' shot hit Gary Roberts in front and appeared to ring off the cross-bar.  The goal judge turned the red light on, and referee Bill McCreary stopped play to check it out.  After conferring at length with the goal judge and the linesmen, McCreary ruled it a goal.  Replays showed his ruling was correct.  Early in the second, with Rob Ramage off for high-sticking Rich Sutter, Trevor Linden unleashed a powerful shot that beat Vernon to tie the game.  In the final minute of the middle stanza, Garth Butcher was sent off for high-sticking Gary Roberts (the two were at each other constantly in the series).  Seconds later, Joe Mullen's shot toward the net hit the skate of Harold Snepsts and directed through McLean's legs to give the lead back to Calgary with a period to play.  The Canucks were the dominant team in the third period, outshooting the Flames 13–10.   At the 7:12 mark, Doug Lidster took a shot on goal as Tony Tanti skated across the goalmouth to screen Vernon.  He actually bumped Vernon's arm as the puck hit Calgary defenseman Brad McCrimmon's skate and slid into the net.  The goal stood, to the outrage of Vernon, and the game was tied.  In the final minute of regulation time, a screened Vernon made a quick glove save off of Greg D. Adams to preserve the tie.  In overtime, there were numerous chances for each team, especially the Canucks. On one chance, Petri Skriko appeared to have a lot of net to shoot at as Vernon was slow coming across, but he didn't get everything on his shot and Vernon managed to kick it out with his left skate.  Stan Smyl had two glorious chances.  He beat Vernon on a wrap-around but hit the far post.  Minutes later, the Flames were caught on a bad change and he had a breakaway, but Vernon was quick with the glove again.  Then Vernon made yet another great glove save off the stick of Tony Tanti.  The Flames had some chances of their own.  Nordmark turned over the puck behind his net and Doug Gilmour fed Mullen alone in front.  Mullen made a move to put McLean down and out, but they young netminder flung his goal-stick out in desperation and knocked the puck away at the goal line.  On another occasion, the Flames did put the puck over the line, but the net had been dislodged an instant before.  Finally, in the last minute of the first overtime period, the Flames rushed into the Vancouver zone.  Jim Peplinski sent a seemingly harmless shot toward the net that re-directed, perhaps intentionally, off the skate of Joel Otto and into the net.  Only Otto knows for sure what his intentions were, and years later he claimed that he did not even see the shot coming.  Perhaps he's right, as Doug Lidster was trying to clear him from the front of the net at the time.  There was a lot of confusion, but the goal stood.  David had come so close to knocking off Goliath, but it was not to be.  The game was a classic.  And the Canucks could take solace in being the only team to take the Stanley Cup Champion Flames to the brink of elimination that spring.

Calgary wins best-of-seven series 4 games to 3

Awards and records

That summer, several Canucks were acknowledged for their performances during the season by becoming the first Canucks to be nominated for post-season awards. Though Trevor Linden (Calder Memorial Trophy), Kirk McLean (Vezina Trophy), Stan Smyl (Masterton Trophy), and coach Bob McCammon (Jack Adams Trophy) came away empty-handed, they, along with all of their teammates, had truly given the fans of Vancouver a series to remember.

 Trevor Linden, Runner-up, Calder Trophy
 Trevor Linden, NHL All-Rookie Team
 Trevor Linden, Voted The Hockey News Rookie-of-the-Year
 Trevor Linden, Molson Cup (Most game star selections for Vancouver Canucks)
 Trevor Linden, Cyclone Taylor Award (MVP of the Canucks)
 Trevor Linden, Most Exciting Player (Canucks team award)

References

Vancouver Canucks seasons
Vancouver C
Vancouver